Adil Abukayevich Ibragimov (born 23 April 1989) is a Russian former football player.

Career
Ibragimov made his debut in the Russian Premier League on 13 June 2009 for FC Khimki in a game against FC Spartak Moscow.

Whilst on loan with Skonto Riga, Ibragimov won the 2012 Latvian Cup, despite being sent off after in the 62nd minute.

In July 2013 Ibragimov signed a two-year contract with Sumgayit of the Azerbaijan Premier League. After one season with Sumgayit, 
Ibragimov left in June 2014.

Career statistics

Personal life
Ibragimov is the second cousin of fellow footballer Eldar Mamayev.

Honours
Skonto Riga
Latvian Cup (1): 2011–12

References

External links
 

1991 births
Living people
Footballers from Makhachkala
Russian footballers
Association football defenders
FC Khimki players
FC Fakel Voronezh players
Skonto FC players
Sumgayit FK players
FC Solyaris Moscow players
Russian Premier League players
Oberliga (football) players
Landesliga players
Russian expatriate footballers
Expatriate footballers in Latvia
Expatriate footballers in Azerbaijan
Russian expatriate sportspeople in Latvia
Expatriate footballers in Germany
Russian expatriate sportspeople in Germany